The Christopher Inn was a hotel in Downtown Columbus, Ohio. The cylindrical mid-century modern hotel had 16 floors, 137 wedge-shaped rooms, and modern interiors at the time. It was built on the site of the Alfred Kelley mansion, which was disassembled in order to build the hotel. The Christopher Inn operated from 1963 to 1988, when it was demolished. The site is now used as a surface parking lot.

History

The site for the Christopher Inn was originally the Alfred Kelley mansion, built in 1838, and used as a Catholic school in the early 1900s. The building was demolished c. 1961, and its remains are scattered throughout the Cuyahoga Valley National Park. By 1963, the Christopher Inn was completed on the site. it was one of the taller buildings in Columbus at the time. It was owned and developed by the Pontifical College Josephinum, a Catholic seminary in Columbus. The hotel's name evoked Saint Christopher, the patron saint of travelers. The hotel opened on July 29, 1963; its general manager at opening was Henry I. Orringer. The building quickly became an icon of downtown Columbus.

In 1962, Columbus hotels spent about $5 million in upgrades to decor, air conditioning, and other alterations. The hotels were aiming to meet competition from the Christopher Inn, as well as from the new Columbus Plaza Hotel, both of which opened in 1963.

By 1986, there were several changes in ownership and proposals to update or expand the hotel, including a space needle and rotating restaurant. By the 1980s, new high-rises dwarfed the hotel, and its size was too small for the larger crowds Columbus was drawing in. It went into foreclosure and was sold in a sheriff's sale in February 1988. It was torn down from April to June of that year, only to become a parking lot, now used by the School Employees Retirement System. S.G. Loewendick & Sons, responsible for demolishing many Columbus landmarks, demolished the hotel.

In January 2020, it was reported that a former member of Karlsberger & Associates wants to rebuild the hotel. Clyde Gosnell, who worked on the project in the 1960s, was putting together drawings to recreate it, though incorporating modern technology. The original drawings are kept by the Ohio History Connection, which received them along with 54 other projects' documents in 1985.

Attributes and design

The Christopher Inn was designed by Karlsberger & Associates, along with Leon Ransom, the first known African American architect of prominence in the city. The cylindrical hotel was mid-century modern, given its simple style, ample use of windows, and open interiors. It was described as a motor inn due to its size and parking accommodations beneath the hotel floors. The Christopher Inn had 16 floors, 137 pie-slice rooms, and a heated pool. 710 glass panels were used throughout the entire building. The hotel neighbored Memorial Hall, which became the location for the Center of Science and Industry (now known by its acronym, COSI) in 1964. Next to that is the Midland Building, and across the street was the first Wendy's restaurant (today the Catholic Foundation and Jubilee Museum).

Its decor was modern at its opening in 1963, but became dated by 1977. Custom furniture was designed for each room, fitting their rounded corners. Each room had floor-to-ceiling glass walls with a panoramic view of downtown Columbus. Rough stone walls were used throughout the lower levels, along with free-hanging staircases with red and gold carpets. The lobby had a wide view of Broad Street, while the mezzanine overlooked a  circular pool and a landscaped stone terrace. The hotel's restaurant, Henry's, was described as 'stylish and modern'.

See also
 List of demolished buildings and structures in Columbus, Ohio
 Renaissance Columbus Downtown Hotel, built nearby at the same time

References

External links

 
 Images at Grandview Heights Public Library

Demolished hotels in the United States
1963 establishments in Ohio
1988 disestablishments in Ohio
Buildings and structures demolished in 1988
Hotel buildings completed in 1963
Defunct hotels in Ohio
Demolished buildings and structures in Downtown Columbus, Ohio
Hotels in Columbus, Ohio
Modernist architecture in Ohio
Broad Street (Columbus, Ohio)